Old Pickens Presbyterian Church is a historic church in Seneca, South Carolina.

It was built in 1850 and added to the National Register in 1996.

References

External links
Old Pickens Foundation

Presbyterian churches in South Carolina
Churches on the National Register of Historic Places in South Carolina
Churches completed in 1850
19th-century Presbyterian church buildings in the United States
National Register of Historic Places in Oconee County, South Carolina
Churches in Oconee County, South Carolina
Seneca, South Carolina